Clayton Robson de Lima (born March 5, 1985 in Cascavel), known as Clayton He-Man, is a Brazilian footballer who plays as defender for São Francisco–PA. He already played for national competitions such as Copa do Brasil, Campeonato Brasileiro Série D and Campeonato Brasileiro Série B.

Career statistics

References

External links

1985 births
Living people
Brazilian footballers
Association football defenders
Campeonato Brasileiro Série B players
Campeonato Brasileiro Série D players
Agremiação Sportiva Arapiraquense players
Nacional Futebol Clube players